Whispers of a Machine is a point-and-click adventure video game developed by Clifftop Games and published by Raw Fury in April 2019.

Plot
Whispers of a Machine is set in a futuristic Sweden. The player is an augmented government agent, Vera Englund, who arrives in a small town to investigate a murder.

Gameplay
Whispers of a Machine is a point-and-click adventure game. There are several different cybernetic augmentations that the player character can use to investigate the environment. Forensic scanner is used to scan a room for DNA and fingerprints. Biometric analyser is used to monitor suspect's heartrate. Muscle boost gives Vera super strength for a short time. Picking dialogue choices gives points to different personality traits: empathetic, analytical, or assertive. These lead to different augmentations and puzzle solutions.

Reception

Whispers of a Machine garnered generally positive reviews, and holds an average of 77/100 on aggregate web site Metacritic.

John Walker of Rock Paper Shotgun gave an overall positive review: "I really enjoyed it, I really appreciated having a methodical, forthright adventure game to play, with excellent art and animations, good music, great acting, and a story worth hearing. I just wish I'd been more of a detective as I did it."

The game was a nominee for Best Adventure and won the Reader's Choice award at the 2019 Aggie Awards.

See also
Kathy Rain, Clifftop Games' previous game

References

External links

2019 video games
Adventure Game Studio games
Android (operating system) games
Detective video games
Indie video games
IOS games
MacOS games
Point-and-click adventure games
Post-apocalyptic video games
Raw Fury games
Science fiction video games
Single-player video games
Video games about police officers
Video games developed in Sweden
Video games featuring female protagonists
Video games set in Sweden
Video games with alternate endings
Windows games
Clifftop Games games